The 2016 Fresno State Bulldogs football team represented California State University, Fresno in the 2016 NCAA Division I FBS football season. The Bulldogs were led by fifth-year head coach Tim DeRuyter, but he was fired on October 23 after the team opened the season  offensive coordinator Eric Kiesau was named interim head coach for the remainder of the season. The team played its home games at Bulldog Stadium and were members of the Mountain West Conference, in the West Division. They finished the season 1–11, 0–8 in Mountain West play to finish in last place in the West Division.

Schedule

Source

Game summaries

at Nebraska

Sacramento State

at Toledo

Tulsa

at UNLV

at Nevada

San Diego State

at Utah State

Head coach Tim DeRuyter was fired the following day and replaced by offensive coordinator Eric Kiesau.

Air Force

at Colorado State

Hawaii

San Jose State

References

Fresno State
Fresno State Bulldogs football seasons
Fresno State Bulldogs football